Bernard Secly (born 5 May 1931 in Paris, France, died 12 September 2015 in Paris, France) was a horse trainer in Thoroughbred flat racing and most notably in steeplechase racing.

Secly won five Group One flat races but is best known for his conditioning two French Horse Racing Hall of Fame steeplechase horses, Katko and Al Capone II.

References

External links
 Bernard Secly profile at France Galop

French horse trainers
1931 births
2015 deaths